The men's 80 kg competition in taekwondo at the 2008 Summer Olympics in Beijing took place on August 22 at the Beijing Science and Technology University Gymnasium.

Competition format
The main bracket consisted of a single elimination tournament, culminating in the gold medal match. Two bronze medals were awarded at the taekwondo competitions. A repechage was used to determine the bronze medal winners. Every competitor who lost to one of the two finalists competed in the repechage, another single-elimination competition. Each semifinal loser faced the last remaining repechage competitor from the opposite half of the bracket in a bronze medal match.

Schedule
All times are China standard time (UTC+8)

Qualifying Athletes

Results
Legend
PTG — Won by points gap
SUP — Won by superiority
OT — Won on over time (Golden Point)

Main bracket

Repechage

Controversy
An incident in the men's 80 kg competition may prove to have a more lasting impact on the sport. American Steven López, the two-time defending gold medalist in that class who had not lost a match since 2002, had one point taken away by the referee in the third period of his quarterfinal match against Italy's Mauro Sarmiento. The referee determined that Lopez had used an illegal "cut kick" (blocked an opponent's blow below the waist). The deduction turned Lopez' 2–1 lead to a 1–1 tie, and Lopez lost in sudden-death overtime. Team USA's team leader, Herb Perez, unsuccessfully protested the decision, asserting that Lopez had raised his left leg in defense and Sarmiento had kicked into the leg in an attempt to draw the deduction.

In the wake of the decision, Perez leveled serious charges against the sport's governing body, the World Taekwondo Federation:
 He claimed that the protest was not properly handled. Typically, decisions on protests must be made within 15 minutes. No response was made for 45 minutes.
 He also stated that the U.S. team received no indication why the protest was deemed "unacceptable". According to Perez, "Unacceptable could mean anything from we didn’t file the papers properly to we didn’t use the right color pencil... Under the WTF competition rules, we should have been notified about the decision, the criteria, the methodology used, what evidence was presented, and what referees were reviewing it. We were not."
 Perez also said that at a June 2008 conference, the heads of the 25 teams that were to compete in Beijing were asked to sign an agreement not to file any protests at the Games.
 After his protest was denied, Perez alleged that WTF officials approached him and asked him not to talk to the press.

Charles Robinson, a writer for Yahoo! Sports in the U.S., called the events surrounding Lopez' match "a chaotic episode that might ultimately prove to be the tipping point to Olympic doom",  adding that it had been widely rumored that taekwondo was on the brink of being removed from the Olympic program.

References

Taekwondo at the 2008 Summer Olympics
Men's events at the 2008 Summer Olympics